Yanaqucha (Quechua yana black, qucha lake, "black lake", also spelled Yanacocha) is a lake in the Andes of Peru. Yanaqucha is located in the Ancash Region, Bolognesi Province, Aquia District. The lake receives waters from the Yanaqucha brook which originates southwest of the peak of Rahu Kutaq.

References 

Lakes of Peru
Lakes of Ancash Region